Dampierre-le-Château is a commune of the Marne department in the Grand Est region of France. It is located on the Yèvre river.

History

Before the French Revolution, it was called "Dampierre-en-Astenois". It was renamed "Dampierre-sur-Yèvre" in 1793, and eventually "Dampierre-le-Château" in 1801.

See also
Communes of the Marne department

References

Dampierrelechateau